Kawngkan is the name of several villages in Burma:

Kawngkan (24°55"N 94°54"E) -Homalin Township, Sagaing Region
Kawngkan (24°42'N 94°38'E) -Homalin Township, Sagaing Region